Baghrān is a village and the district center of Baghran District in Helmand province, Afghanistan. The population of Baghran and the nearest settlements  is 26,724.

In 2005 the United States was funding a $2 million project to pave 700 meters of the Baghran's main road.

It is controlled by the Taliban, and has been called their "most secure stronghold".

Climate
Baghran features a humid continental climate (Köppen: Dsa) with hot summers and moderately cold winters.

See also
 Helmand Province

Taliban captured Area,

References 

Populated places in Helmand Province